Francis David Shawcross (3 July 1941 – 7 November 2015) was an English footballer who played as a wing half in the Football League for Halifax Town, Stockport County and Manchester City.

References

Halifax Town A.F.C. players
Manchester City F.C. players
Stockport County F.C. players
English Football League players
England under-23 international footballers
1941 births
2015 deaths
Association football wing halves
Drogheda United F.C. players
People from Stretford
English footballers